Zhou Shuguang, also known as Zuola, is a Taiwanese blogger and citizen journalist. He has become known for traveling around China to document injustice done to citizens.

Biography
Zhou was born near Shaoshan in Hunan Province. He has been writing a blog documenting many sensitive issues in China, such as freedom of speech, Tibet, nail houses and government censorship of the media. His blog has attracted a lot of interest in China and as such the authorities have tried to shut it down on several occasions. However, Zhou hosts his blog from servers in the United States to get around the blocks. "I don’t feel like I’m in danger because what I’m doing is legal", Zhou states. Zhou advocates further reform in China and travels around the country documenting cases of injustice. During a visit to Hong Kong in 2007, he described it as a "harmonious society".

Zhou is mentioned as a prominent blogger in foreign media. He was invited to attend the Deutsche Welle citizen journalist awards on November 27, 2008, but was prevented from doing so.

Since June 4th, 2018, Zhou received Taiwanese nationality.

Activities

2008 Tibetan unrest
During the 2008 Tibetan unrest, Zhou posted pictures and translated information from foreign news articles that were not mentioned in the state media and posted them on his website.

2008 Guizhou riot
During the 2008 Guizhou riot, Zhou travelled to the area where interviews with the girls' parents and photos of the riot's aftermath were published on his website. His and other bloggers' work were a major reason that four Communist Party, local government and security officials were eventually fired for misuse of power.

2008 Yang Jia case
Zhou was critical of the impartiality of the court proceedings in the Yang Jia case and, along with others, signed an online petition demanding authorities investigate the causes of Yang Jia's murdering spree.

2008 arrest
On August 14, 2008 Zhou was detained for just over an hour in his hometown in Hunan province. He was able to tweet what was happening as he was led out of the house then forced into a vehicle where he was driven back to his hometown of Meitanba. After his release, Zhou's computer was returned, but he was put under town arrest and is not allowed to leave Meitanba.

References

External links
Zuola.com - Zhou Shuguang's blog (mostly in Chinese)
Zuola's Twitter account (mostly in Chinese)
 Article from the "Chinese Bloggers Score a Victory Against the Government", Wall Street Journal, 2008 

Taiwanese activists
Taiwanese bloggers
Free speech activists
Living people
Internet activists
Republic of China journalists
People from Ningxiang
Writers from Changsha
Year of birth missing (living people)